Hubert Loisel (23 April 1912 – 24 February 1999) was an Austrian fencer. He competed at the 1936, 1948 and 1952 Summer Olympics. His son, Georg Loisel, also fenced for Austria at the Olympics.

References

1912 births
1999 deaths
Austrian male fencers
Austrian sabre fencers
Olympic fencers of Austria
Fencers at the 1936 Summer Olympics
Fencers at the 1948 Summer Olympics
Fencers at the 1952 Summer Olympics